Jan Davidsen (born 24 July 1950) is a Norwegian trade unionist.

He is a firefighter by vocation and worked as such in Bergen. He was elected to the leadership in the Norwegian Union of Municipal Employees in 1985, became deputy leader in 1990 and leader in 1994. When this union merged to form the Norwegian Union of Municipal and General Employees in 2003, Davidsen served as leader until 2013. He was also a central board member of the Labour Party and secretariat member of the Norwegian Confederation of Trade Unions.

References

1950 births
Living people
Trade unionists from Bergen
Norwegian trade union leaders
Labour Party (Norway) politicians